The Ruby Pipeline is a 680-mile, 42-in. diameter natural gas pipeline natural gas pipeline running from Opal, Wyoming, to Malin, Oregon. The route crosses Northern Utah, and Northern Nevada. Ruby Pipeline, L.L.C. filed an application with the Federal Energy Regulatory Commission (FERC) on January 27, 2009, authorizing the construction and operation of the Ruby Pipeline Project. On April 5, 2010, the FERC approved the application. Construction began on July 31, 2010, and the pipeline was placed in service on July 28, 2011.

Controversy
There is concern that the project crosses more than 1000 rivers and streams and, according to the Center for Biological Diversity, threatens some endangered fish species.

The Center for Biological Diversity and Summit Lake Paiute Tribe of Nevada petitioned the Ninth Circuit Court of Appeals for an emergency action blocking the pipeline.  Despite not winning the injunction requests, the Court ultimately ruled in their favor, finding that environmental reviews for the pipeline's impacts to endangered fish species and sagebrush habitats did not comply with environmental laws.

Notes

8 BLM.gov:  Ruby Pipeline Project

Natural gas pipelines in the United States
Energy infrastructure in Nevada
Energy infrastructure in Oregon
Energy infrastructure in Utah
Energy infrastructure in Wyoming
Energy infrastructure completed in 2010
Kinder Morgan
Natural gas pipelines in Wyoming
Natural gas pipelines in Utah
Natural gas pipelines in Nevada
Natural gas pipelines in Oregon